The name George has been used for three tropical cyclones in the Atlantic Ocean and for one in the Australian region of the South-East Indian Ocean.

In the Atlantic:
 1947 Fort Lauderdale hurricane, designated "George" by the Weather Bureau office in Miami
 Hurricane George (1950), developed southeast of Bermuda, intensified to Category 2 hurricane and became extratropical south of Newfoundland
 Tropical Storm George (1951), struck Bay of Campeche and made landfall in Tampico, Mexico

In the Australian region:
 Cyclone George (2007), developed in the Joseph Bonaparte Gulf, intensified to a Category 5 severe tropical cyclone (Australian scale) and hit the Pilbara coast

See also
 List of hurricanes named Georges
 Hurricane Georgette

Atlantic hurricane set index articles
Australian region cyclone set index articles